Shikellamy State Park is a  Pennsylvania state park located at the confluence of the West Branch Susquehanna River and Susquehanna River in Pennsylvania. The park is divided into two sections. The older part, on a bluff on the western bank of the Susquehanna River, is the  Shikellamy overlook in Union Township, Union County. The newer part is the  marina on the southern end of Packer Island in Upper Augusta Township, Northumberland County. Packer's Island lies between the city of Sunbury and the borough of Northumberland at the confluence of the two branches of the river.

History
Shikellamy State Park is named in honor of Shikellamy, an Iroquois chief. Chief Shikellamy played a major role in the history of the frontier in Pennsylvania. He was a friend of the Native Americans and the American Colonists of the 18th century. Shikellamy's village was located near where the overlook section of the park is today.

Shikellamy State Park was opened in two phases. The overlook was opened for visitors in 1960; the marina for boaters opened 12 years later, in 1972.

Adam T. Bower Memorial Dam
The Adam T. Bower Memorial Dam (also the Sunbury Fabridam or Fabri Dam) is the world's longest inflatable dam and it impounds the Susquehanna River. The dam is located just below the confluence of the West and North Branches of the Susquehanna, between the towns of Shamokin Dam and Sunbury.

When it is raised in the summer, it creates the  Lake Augusta, which is used for recreation. The dam and lake are part of Shikellamy State Park.

The dam was named for Adam T. Bower, Chief Clerk of the Pennsylvania House of Representatives from 1967–68 and Director of Services during the Pennsylvania Constitutional Convention of 1967-68, by Act 2001-5 of the Pennsylvania General Assembly.

There are plans underway to add a fish ladder to the dam. The fish ladder is primarily to allow the American shad to access the upper part of the Susquehanna.

Shamokin Dam
On this site there was the earlier Shamokin Dam. This dam maintained an adequate water level for ferry traffic across the Susquehanna from Shamokin (now Sunbury) to the west bank. This is the dam that the west bank town of Shamokin Dam is named after.

There is another, existing, low head dam  down stream, for the Shamokin Dam Power Plant

Recreation

Scenic views

The Overlook has been an important prominent feature of the Susquehanna valley for centuries. Before Moravian settlers inhabited the valley in the 18th century, the Penns creek path began and ended where county line road now sits, an important logistics route for the Native Americans in the area. The path ran from Frankstown, through New Berlin, and eventually to Northumberland. In the 1840s, the cliff was home to John Mason, an eccentric bachelor who constructed a viewing tower that hung at a 45 degree angle of the precipice. The tower was destroyed in 1864. In 1894, a beautiful hotel was constructed where the current pavilion is now, and that hotel burnt to the ground in 1898. In the early 20th century, the cliff was frequented by locals for picnics and leisure, often at what was called table rock. Wealthy mineral miners attempted an excavation of the cliff, in hopes of discovering valuable minerals, but were unsuccessful, leading to a small cut out which gives the appearance of a cave, however, there are no caves anywhere in the cliff. Over the years, scout camps and rehabilitation camps were set up on the land, and in 1960 the state opened a public state park on the land. Shikellamy Overlook offers two scenic overlooks. One can get a view of the northern and western rivers as well as a bird's-eye view of Northumberland, Sunbury, and Hummels Wharf. A breeding pair of state-endangered peregrine falcons have established a successful nest on the cliffs below the scenic overlook. It is only the third known "wild nest" built by the birds in the state. Most other breeding pairs have been introduced to sites throughout the state by the Pennsylvania Game Commission.

Hiking

Both sections of Shikellamy State Park have a hiking trail. At the overlook there is a one-mile (1.6 km) nature trail. Careful hikers will get the chance to observe some wildlife. They might see white-tail deer, many different songbirds and a wide variety of wildflowers. Hikers can also observe the development of forests at the overlook. The forest changes from scrub forest to mature hardwood forest. The marina is encircled by paved walking paths for those interested in taking a walk along the river and marina.

Rowing

In the early-to-mid-19th century, the construction of a dam across the Susquehanna River, just south of the city of Sunbury, produced a lake known as Lake Augusta. In 1874 a group of rowers (log raftmen and shad fishermen) from Shamokin Dam and Sunbury competed in a regatta on Lake Augusta,  rowing in both singles and doubles. The rowers from Shamokin Dam were victorious that day, winning a barrel of flour, gold sleeve buttons and a silver cup, while the rowers from Sunbury vowed to win in the next year. The most popular event of the day was a "tub" race in which the same rowers sat in wash tubs and paddled over a shorter course.

The sport of rowing became a popular sport in central Pennsylvania, and in 1888 a National Association of Amateur Oarsmen Championship was held on the Lake Augusta. Rowers traveled from as far away as Canada and the Midwest to compete, and reportedly, thousands of spectators lined the banks of the river. The number of spectators was so great, the railroad companies rerouted trains to accommodate the throngs of people.

Rowing in Central Pennsylvania was popular until an ice surge in 1904 demolished the dam that made conditions ideal for the sport. In 1968, a new inflatable dam was installed that allowed rowing to slowly return. By the early 1980s Bucknell University had established a crew team, and by the early 1990s Susquehanna University had its own team. Near the end of the last century, a masters rowing club, the Central Pennsylvania Rowing Association, was founded. The college teams and masters club now share a boat house on Lake Augusta near the junction of Routes 11 and 15, just north of Shamokin Dam.

Marina and research center
Shikellamy Marina is on the Susquehanna River. The world's largest inflatable dam is three miles (5 km) downstream from the park. This dam forms Lake Augusta with the banks of the river. The purpose of the dam is to provide recreational boating.

Beginning in 2010 Lake Augusta Outfitters will be operating a full service marina at the park. Boats such as kayaks and canoes will be available to rent on a daily or hourly basis. Additionally a store will be open to provide snacks, boating gear and gas.

It was announced in 2010 that marina building would be remodeled for the purpose of establishing and environmental education center at the park. The project, to be led by the Susquehanna River Heartland Coalition for Environmental Studies, aims to improve water quality, promote research, provide environmental education and address other concerns related to the Susquehanna River watershed. The research would monitor river quality at 17 locations along the West Branch between Lock Haven and Sunbury. Six colleges and universities that lie in the Susquehanna valley are part of the coalition. Students from Bloomsburg University, Lock Haven University, Susquehanna University, Bucknell University, Lycoming College and King's College would use the new center as a base of operations when conducting studies on the river. The coalition hopes to have the conversion completed by 2011.

Boating
Boating is very popular at Shikellamy State Park. The river is busy with recreational boaters and water skiing enthusiasts. All types of boats are permitted, provided that are properly registered with the state.

Fishing
Fishing is a major attraction at Shikellamy State Park. The Susquehanna River is the home of a wide variety of game fish. Anglers will find largemouth bass, smallmouth bass, crappies, catfish, walleye, northern pike, and muskellunge in the waters of Shikellamy State Park

Picnics
There are many picnic tables available for picnicking spread throughout Shikellamy State Park.

Nearby state parks
The following state parks are within  of Shikellamy State Park:

Joseph E. Ibberson Conservation Area (Dauphin County)
McCalls Dam State Park (Centre County)
Milton State Park (Northumberland County)
Ravensburg State Park (Clinton County)
R. B. Winter State Park (Union County)
Sand Bridge State Park (Union County)
Susquehanna State Park (Lycoming County)
Swatara State Park (Lebanon and Schuylkill Counties)

References

External links

  
  

State parks of Pennsylvania
Protected areas established in 1960
Parks in Northumberland County, Pennsylvania
Parks in Union County, Pennsylvania
Protected areas of Northumberland County, Pennsylvania
Protected areas of Union County, Pennsylvania
1960 establishments in Pennsylvania